John Phillips (28 May 1903 – 1985) was a Welsh professional footballer who played as a forward in the Football League, most notably for Bristol Rovers and Merthyr Town. He finished his league career with 107 goals in 179 appearances.

Career 
Phillips began his Football League career with spells at West Bromwich Albion, Rochdale and Southend United and with all of whom he received little playing time. He returned to Wales to sign for Third Division South club Merthyr Town in 1925 and scored 31 goals in 57 league appearances during two seasons with the club. Phillips joined Third Division South club Brentford for a £650 fee in July 1927. Despite missing 19 league games, he showed prolific form, scoring 18 goals in 23 matches during the 1927–28 season. He began the 1928–29 season in similar form, scoring four goals in his six four games, before being sold on 26 September 1928. He again scored prolifically in spells with Bristol Rovers and Coventry City, before ending his career in Wales with Merthyr Town, Barry and Troedyrhiw.

Personal life 
As of 1939, Phillips was club steward at a Labour Club in Barry, at which he also resided.

Career statistics

References

1903 births
Sportspeople from Barry, Vale of Glamorgan
Welsh footballers
English Football League players
Association football forwards
Brentford F.C. players
West Bromwich Albion F.C. players
Southend United F.C. players
Merthyr Town F.C. players
Bristol Rovers F.C. players
Coventry City F.C. players
Rochdale A.F.C. players
Barry Town United F.C. players
Southern Football League players
Troedyrhiw F.C. players
1985 deaths